The International Satellite Cloud Climatology Project (ISCCP) was established as the first project of the World Climate Research Program (WCRP). Since its inception in 1982, there have been two phases, 1983–1995 and 1995–2009.  The project is responsible for collection and analysis of weather satellite radiance measurements.  It infers clouds' global distribution and properties, along with their diurnal, seasonal, and interannual variations. The results are studied to understand clouds in climate, including their effects on radiative energy exchanges, plus their role in the global water cycle. These datasets provide a systematic view of cloud behavior.

The ISCCP headquarters were located at the Goddard Institute for Space Studies in New York City.
ISCCP data is stored at the ISCCP Central Archive and at NASA. While the data are typically  used for climate study, they are also a valuable resource for astronomical pursuits. ISCCP was headed by William B. Rossow.

From 1983, institutions from around the world have collected and analyzed satellite radiance measurements from two polar orbiting and five geostationary satellites.

Objectives
The goals and objectives of the ISCCP have included:
"Produce a global, reduced-resolution, calibrated and normalized, infrared and visible radiance dataset, along with basic information on the radiative properties of the atmosphere, from which cloud parameters can be derived.
Coordinate basic research on techniques for inferring the physical properties of clouds from satellite radiance data.
Derive and validate a global cloud climatology.
Promote research using ISCCP data to improve parameterizations of clouds in climate models.
Improve understanding of the earth’s radiation budget (top-of-atmosphere and surface) and hydrological cycle."

Criticism
Some scientists suggest that the decreasing trends in the ISCCP data are "satellite viewing geometry artifacts" and the data may not be appropriate for some long-term global studies.

See also
 Cooperative Institute for Meteorological Satellite Studies

References

Further reading
 Evan, A. T., Heidinger, A. K., & Vimont, D. J. (2007). "Arguments against a physical long-term trend in global ISCCP cloud amounts (DOI 10.1029/2006GL028083)". Geophysical Research Letters. 34 (4), L04701. ISSN 0094-8276
 Knapp, K. R. (2008). "Calibration Assessment of ISCCP Geostationary Infrared Observations Using HIRS". Journal of Atmospheric and Oceanic Technology. 25 (2), 183-195. ISSN 0739-0572
 Meinke, I. (2006). "A Comparison of Simulated Clouds to ISCCP Data". Monthly Weather Review. 134 (6), 1669-1681. ISSN 0027-0644
 Rossow, W.B., Y. Desormeaux, C.L. Brest, and A. Walker (1992): International Satellite Cloud Climatology Project (ISCCP) Radiance Calibration Report. WMO/TD 520. World Climate Research Programme.
 Rossow, W.B., and R.A. Schiffer (1999): "Advances in understanding clouds from ISCCP". Bull. Amer. Meteorol. Soc., 80, 2261-2288, doi:10.1175/1520-0477(1999)080<2261:AIUCFI>2.0.CO;2.
 Schiffer, R.A., and W.B. Rossow (1983):  "The International Satellite Cloud Climatology Project (ISCCP): The first project of the World Climate Research Programme". Bull. Amer. Meteorol. Soc., 64, 779-784.
 Tsuang, B.-J., Chou, M.-D., Zhang, Y., Roesch, A., & Yang, K. (2008). "Evaluations of Land-Ocean Skin Temperatures of the ISCCP Satellite Retrievals and the NCEP and ERA Reanalyses". Journal of Climate. 21 (2), 308-330. ISSN 0894-8755

External links
 Official website
 Data sets
 FIRE (First ISCCP Regional Experiment)
 GIBBS (Global ISCCP B1 Browse System, 1974-2008)
 Monthly means

Climatological research
Clouds
Scientific organizations established in 1982